Eric Michael-Jay Farris (born March 3, 1986) is an American former professional baseball second baseman and left fielder. He played in Major League Baseball (MLB) for the Milwaukee Brewers. He is currently the manager for the Everett AquaSox, the High-A affiliate of the Seattle Mariners.

Personal life
Farris, who is Black and Filipino American, is the only son of Elizabeth and Darryl Farris. He has two sisters, Jeannette and Jessica, and is married to Kelley (Rose) Farris

Amateur career

High school
Farris went to high school at Hamilton High School in Chandler, Arizona. With the Huskies, he hit .469 with 41 RBI and 50 runs scored, as well as 14 stolen bases, to lead them to back-to-back state titles. He was a Collegiate Baseball/TPX All-American and was named Arizona Player of the Year by the East Valley Tribune and the ABCA. He was selected in the 42nd round, 1269th overall in the 2004 MLB Draft by the Atlanta Braves, but chose to play college with the Loyola Marymount Lions.

College
In 2005, he was slated to be their starting shortstop, but broke his hamate bone just before the season and missed six weeks. After returning in March at second base, he was second on the team in batting average, leading to a second-team All-WCC selection. In 2006, he led the team in numerous categories, with an All-WCC honorable mention. After the 2006 season, he played collegiate summer baseball with the Cotuit Kettleers of the Cape Cod Baseball League and was named a league all-star. 2007 was his best year as a Lion, leading the team in average, stolen bases, runs, hits, and total bases. He was a semifinalist for the Golden Spikes Award. He ended his career with the fourth most stolen bases in team history, despite only three seasons there.

Professional career

Milwaukee Brewers
He was drafted by the Milwaukee Brewers in the 4th round, 131st overall, of the 2007 MLB Draft. In 2007, he made his professional debut for their Rookie League Helena Brewers. Farris played all of the 2008 season with the Class A West Virginia Power and all of the 2009 season with the Class A-Advanced Brevard County Manatees. Though rehabbing with the Rookie Arizona League Brewers early in the 2010 campaign, Farris played the rest of the 2010 season with the Triple-A Nashville Sounds. He hit .256 in 98 games for Nashville before his first call-up.

On July 28, 2011, Farris was called up to the Brewers after they placed Rickie Weeks on the 15-day disabled list with a sprained left ankle. He made his debut that day, going 0–1 in a pinch-hit appearance, not staying in the game. He was optioned back to Nashville the following day.

Seattle Mariners
The Seattle Mariners selected Farris in the Triple-A phase of the 2012 Rule 5 draft.

Minnesota Twins
Farris signed a minor league deal with the Minnesota Twins on January 6, 2014. He elected free agency on November 6, 2015.

Somerset Patriots
On February 25, 2016 Farris was confirmed to have signed with the Somerset Patriots of the Atlantic League of Professional Baseball which is an Indy League on the East Coast of the US and Texas  He became a free agent after the 2016 season.

Coaching career

Seattle Mariners
Farris began his coaching career in 2018, joining the minor league side of his former team, the Seattle Mariners, in a variety of roles. He initially served as the hitting coach for both the Everett AquaSox and the AZL Mariners in 2018 before serving in the same role for the West Virginia Power in 2019.

He was due to serve as the Power's manager in 2020 before the cancellation of all minor league baseball that season thanks to the COVID-19 pandemic. The Power were dissolved following the realignment of Minor League Baseball after the cancelled 2020 season, and Farris spent the 2021 season as the manager of the Low-A Modesto Nuts.

He was announced to be returning to the Everett AquaSox as their manager for the 2022 season on February 2, 2022.

Awards
 Golden Spikes Award Semifinalist - 2007
 Pioneer League Post-Season All-Star - 2007
 Florida State League Mid and Post-Season All-Star - 2009

See also
Rule 5 draft results

References

External links

Loyola Marymount Lions player bio

1986 births
Living people
Milwaukee Brewers players
Loyola Marymount Lions baseball players
Cotuit Kettleers players
Helena Brewers players
West Virginia Power players
Brevard County Manatees players
Nashville Sounds players
Arizona League Brewers players
New Britain Rock Cats players
Rochester Red Wings players
African-American baseball players
Baseball players from Sacramento, California
Major League Baseball second basemen
Surprise Rafters players
Somerset Patriots players
21st-century African-American sportspeople
20th-century African-American people